Open Yale Courses is a project of Yale University to share full video and course materials from its undergraduate courses.

Open Yale Courses provides free access to a selection of introductory courses, and uses a Creative Commons Attribution-Noncommercial-Share Alike license.

Open Yale Courses launched in December 2007 with seven courses from various departments.  The project now includes 42 courses from a broad range of introductory courses taught at Yale college.  The initiative was funded by the William and Flora Hewlett Foundation, which has supported other universities' OpenCourseWare projects. As of August 2014 some of Yale's Open Courses are delivered by the European MooC platform Eliademy.

Courses

References

External links
 
 Open Yale Courses: 10 New Courses Available Now! on YouTube
 Yale OpenYaleCourses on YouTube

Creative Commons-licensed websites
Yale University
OpenCourseWare